The Course of Empire is a 1952 book by the American journalist and historian Bernard DeVoto.  It is the third volume of a trilogy that includes The Year of Decision (1942) and Across the Wide Missouri (1947).

Description
The Course of Empire is a history of the exploration of Western North America. The book chronicles several centuries of searching for a Northwest Passage, a water route that would connect the settlements of the Atlantic seaboard with trading markets in India and China. The book proceeds in unconventional narrative fashion, focusing on how centuries of geographical study of the continent, especially its hydrology, shaped the exploration of the West, and eventually a United States that reached from coast to coast.

Reception
The book was widely-praised, called "a permanent contribution to history" by Kirkus.

The book was awarded a National Book Award in 1953.

References

History books about the American Old West
1952 non-fiction books
Fur trade
Houghton Mifflin books
Bancroft Prize-winning works